Lionello Levi Sandri (5 October 1910 in Milan – 14 April 1991 in Rome) was an Italian politician and European Commissioner.

Upon completing his education in 1932, Levi Sandri entered a career as a civil servant in the Italian employment administration and was promoted to high-ranking posts at a young age. In 1940 he became a lecturer in industrial law at the University of Rome.  In the same year, he served in North Africa in the Second World War. Following the armistice on 8 September 1943 and the related events, however, he chose to join the resistance movement against Benito Mussolini, where he came to lead the partisan formation "Fiamme Verdi" (Green Flames) in the Brescia region.

After the war Levi Sandri became involved in the Italian Socialist Party (PSI). From 1946 to 1950 he was a member of the town council for Brescia. From 1948 he was a member of the party executive committee at a regional level. Moreover, he was the chief of staff in the Italian Ministry for Employment.

He later advocated the formation of the Party of European Socialists.

He was appointed to the first European Commission in December 1960 (or February 1961) as the successor to Giuseppe Petrilli in the Hallstein Commission and was responsible for the Social Affairs portfolio, in addition to overseas states and territories. He supported the equalisation of work and social rights between the EEC states. He continued as a member of the second Hallstein Commission (1962–1967), where he was a vice-president from 1964, and as a member of the Rey Commission from 1967 to 1970.

References

|-

|-

|-

1910 births
1991 deaths
Italian European Commissioners
Italian socialists
European Commissioners 1967–1970